Val Hanley was a Mayor of Galway, Ireland.

A well-known publican and member of the Vintners' Federation of Ireland (to which he was elected President in 2008), Hanley began work with his brothers and uncle in Claregalway in his early twenties. Following this he lived and worked in England for eight years, moving back to Galway in the early 1990s. "There's always something on in Galway. We have the Arts Festival, the Oyster Festival and The Races; we're like a city of festivals."

A member of Údaras na Gaeltachta and a former Fianna Fáil councillor, he states his election to Mayor of Galway in 2002 is his proudest. "I think one of the biggest honours for anyone would be to be Mayor of their city because you're the Mayor for everyone ... [the] role involves representing the views of our members and forging links with bodies such as Fáilte Ireland, Tourism Ireland and The Oireachtas is a big one."

Hanley failed in his bid to be re-elected to Galway City Council in 2004. In 2009, he was eventually put on the ticket again, but failed to take a seat once more, although his transfers helped to put running mate Peter Keane over the line.

Hanley is currently the proprietor of the Hanley Oaks Hotel and Murty Rabbitt's pub, along with his son Ciaran.

References

External links
 https://web.archive.org/web/20071119083053/http://www.galwaycity.ie/AllServices/YourCouncil/HistoryofTheCityCouncil/PreviousMayors/
 http://anghaeltacht.net/val/

Politicians from County Galway
Mayors of Galway
Year of birth missing (living people)
Living people
Fianna Fáil politicians
Local councillors in Galway (city)